Blood Axis are an American band, made up of journalist and author Michael Moynihan, music producer Robert Ferbrache, and musician and author Annabel Lee.

Overview

Early Blood Axis (1989–1999)
Moynihan had founded Coup de Grace, a multimedia project that produced live performances and cassettes and also released booklets of images and texts, the last of which was Friedrich Nietzsche's The Antichrist. The first output from the new appellation were two songs, "Lord of Ages" (employing lyrics from Rudyard Kipling's poem on Mithras) and "Electricity", which appeared on a German music sampler. These tracks were well received in Europe and were followed by two more songs that appeared on the compilation, Im Blutfeuer.

In 1995, Moynihan released the first full-length studio LP, The Gospel of Inhumanity with the help of Robert Ferbrache. The album wedded the music of Johann Sebastian Bach and Sergei Prokofiev with modern electronics. Moynihan implemented a recording of Ezra Pound reading from his The Cantos. He also included lyrics from Nietzsche and Longfellow<ref name=LONGFELLOW>[http://www.pitt.edu/~dash/longfellow.html#challenge Longfellow, Henry Wadsworth—The Challenge of Thor"]; Pitt; .</ref> as well as his own to the work.

The band consisted of Michael Moynihan (vocals, bodhrán), Annabelle Lee (melodeon, electric violin) and Robert Ferbrache (guitars, keyboards).

Contemporary Blood Axis (2000–2016)
In 2005, Blood Axis played the German Flammenzauber festival, showcasing reworked live versions of several previously released songs, a number of Irish folk songs and the live debut of a few new songs. April 2006 saw further live activity from Blood Axis, as well as a new medium for the duo's folk-oriented material entitled Knotwork at the Swiss Triumvirat festival.

Beginning in 1998, Moynihan began saying that Blood Axis was at work on a second full-length album, at one time said to be entitled Ultimacy. On 2 January 2009, Blood Axis played in Sintra, Portugal, with members of Portuguese band Sangre Cavallum. Moynihan stated on stage that the new album, now titled Born Again, was to be released the following Easter.

Blood Axis makes references to neopagan and völkisch concepts and figures such as Ludwig Fahrenkrog and Fidus. Moynihan is interested in rune mysticism. Beginning in the 2000s, he has been influenced by the neofascist movement Nouvelle Droite and Alain de Benoist.

Discography

Albums
 The Gospel of Inhumanity, 1995
 CD and 2×LP. Released by Cthulhu/Storm.
 CD rerelease on Elfenblut/Misanthropy/Storm in 1998.
 CD rerelease with deluxe packaging on Tesco Distribution/Storm in 2001.
 Blót: Sacrifice in Sweden, 1998
 CD and 2x12" LP limited to 600 copies. Released by Cold Meat Industry.
 Born Again, 2010
 CD released on Storm. STRM12
 Ultimacy, 2011
 CD compilation of all the singles and compilation tracks. Released on Storm. STRM13

Collaborations and split releases
 Walked in Line, 1995
 Split 7-inch EP with Allerseelen. Released by Storm Records.
 The March of Brian Boru, 1998
 Split 7-inch EP with Allerseelen. Released by Stateart.
 Witch-Hunt: The Rites of Samhain, 2001
 Collaboration with In Gowan Ring. Privately released CD-R.
 Absinthe: La Folie Verte, 2001
 Collaborative CD with Les Joyaux De La Princesse. Released by Athanor.
 Absinthe: La Folie Verte LP box, 2002
 Collaborative 2x10" LP box with Les Joyaux De La Princesse containing remixes of Absinthe: La Folie Verte. Released by Athanor.
 Rereleased on CD as Absinthia Taetra by Athanor in 2004
 The Dream / Fröleichen So Well Wir, 2010
 Split 7-inch EP with Andrew King. Released on Storm. STRM09

Witch-Hunt: The Rites of SamhainWitch-Hunt: The Rites of Samhain is a recording of a 1999 live collaboration of Blood Axis and In Gowan Ring, performing as Witch-Hunt. The album was not released on a label.  Limited to 100 CDR copies for private distribution, it was sold only at select Blood Axis concerts in Portugal. The album came in a special hand-made fold-out sleeve with leaf.

Track listing:

Witch Hunt recorded live on Samhain, 31 October 1999
 Welcoming By Harold McNeill I Lay Stretched On Your Grave / Morning Dew Two Magicians Sea Ritual Dead Men's Slip-Jig The Rolling of the Stones The Black One''
Bonus tracks:
 The Rolling of the Stones - In Gowan Ring, from the compilation The Pact of the Gods
 The March of Brian Boru - Blood Axis, from the compilation 10 Years of Madness
 Follow Me Up To Carlow - Blood Axis, previously unreleased

References

Citations

Sources

External links

 Official Blood Axis website
 Blood Axis Archive - the new location of the bloodaxis.com fansite
 Michael Moynihan Interview; Between Birds of Prey from Heathen Harvest, 2005

American folk musical groups
Neofolk music groups
Musical groups established in 1989
American industrial music groups
Martial industrial groups
1989 establishments in the United States
Modern pagan musical groups